John Blaxland may refer to:
 John Blaxland (explorer) (1769–1845), pioneer settler and explorer in Australia
 John Blaxland (politician) (1801–1884), English-born Australian politician
 John Blaxland (historian) (born 1963), Australian historian and academic

See also
 Blaxland (disambiguation)